"Live and Learn" is a song by American new jack swing group Joe Public, released in March 1992 as the second single from their self-titled debut album. It was a success, peaking at number four on the US Billboard Hot 100, number three in the Netherlands and New Zealand and number 10 in Belgium. It was ranked number 16 on Complex magazine's list of the "25 Best New Jack Swing Songs of All Time".

Samples

The song heavily utilizes sampling; the song samples the drum break from Sly & the Family Stone's "Sing a Simple Song". The squealing trumpet glissando heard throughout is a sample from "The Grunt" by the J.B.'s. Vocal samples from James Brown's "Get Up, Get Into It, Get Involved" and the Soul Children's "I Don't Know What This World Is Coming To" are present, as well as replayed samples of "All Your Goodies Are Gone" by Parliament and "Peg" by Steely Dan.

Charts

Weekly charts

Year-end charts

References

1992 singles
1992 songs
Columbia Records singles
New jack swing songs